Margaret Evans Price (March 20, 1888 – November 20, 1973) was a U.S. toy manufacturer. With her husband, Irving Price, and Herman Fisher, she co-founded Fisher-Price Toys in 1930. Margaret Evans was a children's book illustrator and artist. She became the first Art Director of Fisher-Price and designed push-pull toys for the opening line, based on characters from her children's books.

Family
Margaret was a member of the wealthy Evans family of New York who for a time had an effective monopoly on the building material industry in the City.  Margaret's Brother Heathcliff expanded his Father's business operations to include a book binding business which at its peak encompassed a complex of buildings on East 12th Street in Manhattan. Margaret's Cousin was Republican Politician and Chief Justice of the US Supreme Court Charles Evans Hughes.

After getting married, she lived with her family in East Aurora, New York. In 2014, her former residence is being considered for demolition or historical preservation.

Career
Margaret Evans began her art career at an early age, and sold her first illustrated story to the Boston Journal in 1900. She attended high school in Charlestown, Boston, and went on to study at the Massachusetts Normal Art School. From there, she went on to study at the Boston Academy of Fine Arts under the tutelage of Joseph DeCamp and Vesper George. Before she married Irving Price, Evans worked as a freelance artist in New York City, publishing with Rand McNally, Harper & Brothers and Stecher Lithography [Rochester, NY] After the formation of Fisher-Price, Margaret went on to exhibit her work in many galleries nationally. She was also published in Nature Magazine, the Women's Home Companion, and Pictorial Review.

Notes

External links

 

1888 births
1973 deaths
Fisher-Price
Toy inventors
American women illustrators
American illustrators
People from East Aurora, New York